Jo Jung-suk (born December 26, 1980) is a South Korean actor. He began his career in theater, starring in Spring Awakening, Hedwig and the Angry Inch, and the stage adaptation of The Harmonium in My Memory, among many other musicals and plays.

After nearly a decade on the stage, Jo made his film debut as a comedic supporting actor in the 2012 box office hit Architecture 101, which became his breakout role. His versatility was further showcased by the television series The King 2 Hearts (2012), You're the Best, Lee Soon-shin (2013), Oh My Ghost (2015), Don't Dare to Dream (2016), Hospital Playlist (2020), as well as films The Face Reader (2013), My Love, My Bride (2014), My Annoying Brother (2016), Exit (2019).

Career
Jo Jung-suk had always wanted to be on stage. He was admitted into the Theater department of Seoul Institute of the Arts on student loan, but after his father died in 2000, Jo's widowed mother became fully dependent on him. He was granted an exemption from military service due to family circumstances, and he quit school before graduating so he could start earning money by doing musicals. He made his professional acting debut in The Nutcracker in 2004.

Jo then became active and well known in musical theatre, acting in a total of 25 musicals during the first nine years of his career, including Organ in My Heart (musical adaptation of The Harmonium in My Memory), Janggeum the Great (musical adaptation of Jewel in the Palace), and Korean productions of Hedwig and the Angry Inch, Grease, The Island, and Spring Awakening.

In 2011 he landed his first television role on cable series What's Up as an awkward but talented music student. But 2012 would be his breakout year, starring in two high-profile projects. In his big screen debut, he played a supporting role in box office hit Architecture 101. As the young hero's best friend Nab-ddeuk, Jo's performance brimmed with personality and comic timing, and he won Best New Actor at the Blue Dragon Film Awards, as well as received nominations from the Grand Bell Awards and Buil Film Awards. He was once again a scene stealer in his third onscreen role as earnest soldier Eun Shi-kyung in the drama series The King 2 Hearts. Jo's display of versatility and screen presence in those projects caused a surge in mainstream popularity for the actor, resulting in close to twenty offers for films and TV series, not to mention commercials.

He next starred in big-screen comedy Almost Che, loosely based on a real-life incident from 1985, in which student activists forcibly occupied the US Cultural Center in Seoul and had a standoff with the police. After filming the period drama Song Kang-ho-starred The Face Reader (for which he later won Best Supporting Actor at the Grand Bell Awards), Jo returned to television in his first onscreen leading role in the 2013 family drama You're the Best, Lee Soon-shin.

Jo appeared in two films in 2014: the period thriller The Fatal Encounter, where he played an assassin targeting King Jeongjo, and the romantic comedy My Love, My Bride, a remake of the same-titled 1990 hit in which he and Shin Min-ah played a newly married couple.

In 2015, Jo played an arrogant star chef who falls for his kitchen assistant who's been possessed by a virgin ghost in Oh My Ghost, which was a commercial and critical hit. He also headlined The Exclusive: Beat the Devil's Tattoo, in which he played a TV news reporter who gets a scoop, followed by the time-hopping thriller Time Renegade.

In 2016, Jo played an announcer in SBS's romantic comedy Don't Dare to Dream who falls for a weather announcer (played by Gong Hyo-jin). The series was a hit and led to increased popularity for Jo, who then became one of the most in-demand actors in the industry. He then headlined the comedy-drama film My Annoying Brother alongside Park Shin-hye and Do Kyung-soo of Exo. The film topped box office charts and earned positive reviews for Jo, who was praised for his comedic timing and chemistry with co-star Do.

In 2017, Jo was cast in the gangster thriller The Drug King, directed by Woo Min-ho. The same year, he made his small-screen comeback in MBC's fantasy comedy drama Two Cops.

In 2018, Jo was cast in the action thriller film Hit-and-Run Squad in which he took a role as an antagonist, as well as the disaster action film Exit.

In 2019, Jo starred in the historical drama Nokdu Flower.

In 2020, Jo starred in the medical drama Hospital Playlist, as Lee Ik-jun, an assistant professor of general surgery. He reprised his role in season 2 in 2021.

In 2022, Jo hosts the 2022 Jo Jung-suk Show at Mastercard Hall in Blue Square, Seoul for two days at 6 PM on September 3 and 5 PM on 4.

Endorsement
There are 12 brands that Jo Jung-seok has been active as an advertising model. These products include mobile communications, credit cards, drinks, ramen, reading platforms, masks and more. Jo was getting love calls from advertising since the success of Architecture 101 and the drama The King 2 Hearts in 2012. His first terrestrial TV commercial was as an LG U+ model.

The success of the film My Annoying Brother established Jo further. He was selected as the brand ambassador of an online english learning platform in 2016. His CF video had gone viral on social media.

Another famous CF of Jo's was his tuna CF with Son Na-eun. In 2021, Jo ranked 4th in a CF revenue chart.

Personal life
Jo has been in a relationship with singer Gummy since 2013. In June 2018, it was announced that Jo would marry Gummy in fall. On October 8, 2018, news broke that the couple got married privately. On January 6, 2020, Gummy's agency confirmed that she was 7 weeks pregnant with the couple's first child. On August 6, 2020, Jo and wife Gummy welcomed their first daughter.

Philanthropy 
In 2019, newlywed Jo Jeong-seok and Gummy, donated 30 million won to the National Disaster Relief Association.

Filmography

Film

Television series

Television show

Web shows

Theater

Discography

Soundtrack appearances

Compilation appearances

Awards and nominations

State honors

Listicles

Notes

References

External links

  at JAM Entertainment 
 
 
 

1980 births
Living people
21st-century South Korean male actors
Male actors from Seoul
South Korean male stage actors
South Korean male musical theatre actors
South Korean male film actors
South Korean male television actors
South Korean television personalities
Seoul Institute of the Arts alumni